The 1974 Davidson Wildcats football team represented Davidson College as a member of the Southern Conference (SoCon) during the 1974 NCAA Division I football season. Led by first-year head coach Ed Farrell, the Wildcats compiled an overall record of 2–7 with a mark of 0–3 in conference play, placing last out of eight teams in the SoCon.

Schedule

References

Davidson
Davidson Wildcats football seasons
Davidson Wildcats football